New Jersey Medical School (NJMS)—also known as Rutgers New Jersey Medical School—is a medical school of Rutgers University, a public research university in Newark, New Jersey. It has been part of the Rutgers Division of Biomedical and Health Sciences since the 2013 dissolution of the University of Medicine and Dentistry of New Jersey. Founded in 1954, NJMS is the oldest school of medicine in New Jersey.

History
The school of medicine was founded in 1954 as the Seton Hall College of Medicine and Dentistry, established under the auspices of the Roman Catholic Archdiocese of Newark, in Jersey City, New Jersey. On August 6, 1954, the College was incorporated as a legal entity separate from Seton Hall University, but with an interlocking Board of Trustees. The first class of 80 students was admitted to the four-year MD program in September 1956, becoming only the sixth medical school in the New York City metropolitan area.  In 1965, the institution was acquired by the State of New Jersey, renamed the New Jersey College of Medicine and Dentistry (NJCMD), and relocated to Newark, New Jersey. With the passing of the Medical and Dental Education Act of 1970, signed into law by Governor William T. Cahill on June 16, the College of Medicine and Dentistry of New Jersey (CMDNJ) was created, merging NJCMD with the two-year medical school established at Rutgers University in 1961, under a single board of trustees.

With the creation of the CMDNJ, the medical school adopted its title the New Jersey Medical School. In 1981, legislation signed on December 10 by Governor Byrne established CMDNJ as the University of Medicine and Dentistry of New Jersey (UMDNJ). NJMS served as one of five regional campuses that constitute the UMDNJ health science institution. On June 28, 2012 the New Jersey state legislature passed a bill that dissolved the University of Medicine and Dentistry of New Jersey and merged most of its schools including New Jersey Medical School with Rutgers University forming a new Rutgers Division of Biomedical and Health Sciences effective July 1, 2013.  With a cohesive student body, each class consisting of approximately 170 students, NJMS is experiencing impressive growth on a number of fronts. Robert L. Johnson is the current dean.

Research 

In 2004, the school received $104 million in extramural grants supporting basic, clinical and translational research. New Jersey Medical School is also home to the Global Tuberculosis Institute, The Institute for Ophthalmology and Visual Science, and the Center for Emerging and Reemerging Pathogens. New Jersey Medical School is a charter member of the New Jersey Stem Cell Research and Education Foundation. The Summer Student Research Program provides students with stipends to conduct research in the laboratories of NJMS faculty. Each year, more than 100 first- and second-year students, as well as prospective students considering medical school, participate in the program, which has a strong emphasis on cancer research and heart, lung and blood research. NJMS faculty have contributed significantly to medical science breakthroughs including the development of the worldwide standard in knee replacement, the New Jersey Knee; a patented method for the early detection of Lyme disease; the identification of pediatric AIDS and the development of drug-therapy to reduce the likelihood of pre-natal transmission; and proof of the connection between smoking and cancer resulting in the warning message printed on cigarette packages.

Teaching hospitals 

New Jersey Medical School’s core teaching hospital, The University Hospital, is located on campus. It is home to a Level I Trauma Center, the busiest in the state, and one of the nation’s most active liver transplant programs. The 504-bed facility is also highly regarded for its Comprehensive Stroke Center, the New Jersey Cardiovascular Institute (NJCI), the cochlear Implant Program, a neurosurgical intensive care unit and a special Brain Tumor Program, the Neurological Institute of New Jersey, a federally designated spinal cord injury program and The University Center for Bloodless Surgery and Medicine. University Hospital is also the state’s single largest provider of charity care. Approximately 500 residents are pursuing advanced clinical training at University Hospital in 18 accredited programs.

Other major affiliated teaching sites include Hackensack University Medical Center, Morristown Medical Center, and the East Orange Veterans Affairs Hospital. And more recently the addition of Trinitas Regional Center for the internal medicine program.

Admissions 

Admission to NJMS is highly selective and competitive. NJMS selects its students on the basis of academic excellence, leadership qualities, demonstrated compassion for others and broad extracurricular experiences. One hundred and seventy students enrolled in the class of 2012, selected from over 5,000 applicants. All applicants must be either permanent residents or citizens of the United States, meet specific course requirements, and take the Medical College Admissions Test (MCAT).

Notable alumni and faculty
 Virendra Nath Pandey, Associate professor, Shanti Swarup Bhatnagar laureate
 Robert A. Schwartz, Chairman of Dermatology, co-discoverer of the Schwartz-Burgess Syndrome

References

External links
 

Rutgers University colleges and schools
University of Medicine and Dentistry of New Jersey
Medical schools in New Jersey
Educational institutions established in 1954
Education in Newark, New Jersey
Former Catholic universities and colleges in the United States
Seton Hall University
1954 establishments in New Jersey
Education in Essex County, New Jersey